Narrative forms have been subject to classification by literary theorists, in particular during the 1950s, a period which has been described metaphorically as the Linnaean period in the study of narrative.

Narrative forms include: 
Autobiography – a detailed description or account of the storyteller's own life.
Biography – a detailed description or account of someone's life.
Captivity narrative – a story in which the protagonist is captured and describes their experience with the culture of their captors.
Epic – a very long narrative poem, often written about a hero or heroine and their exploits.
Epic poem – a lengthy story of heroic exploits in the form of a poem.
Essay - a short literary composition that reflects the author's outlook or point
Fable – a didactic story, often using animal characters who behave like people.
Fantasy – a story about characters that may not be realistic and about events that could not really happen.
Flash fiction – a fictional work of extreme brevity that still offers character and plot development.
Folk tale – an old story which has been passed down orally and which reveals the customs of a culture.
Historical fiction – stories which take place in real historical settings and which often feature real historical figures and events, but which center on fictional characters or events.
Legend – a story that is based on fact but often includes exaggerations about the hero (e.g. the East African legend of Fumo Liyongo in the coast of Kenya).
Memoir – similar to an autobiography, except that memoirs generally deal with specific events in the life of the author.
Myth – an ancient story often meant to explain the mysteries of life or nature.
News – information on current events which is presented by print, broadcast, Internet, or word of mouth to a third party or mass audience.
Nonlinear narrative – a story whose plot does not conform to conventional chronology, causality, and/or perspective.
Novel – a long, written narrative, normally in prose, which describes fictional characters and events, usually in the form of a sequential story.
Novella – a written, fictional, prose narrative normally longer than a short story but shorter than a novel.
Parable – a succinct, didactic story, in prose or verse, which illustrates one or more instructive lessons or principles.
Play – a story that is told mostly through dialogue and is meant to be performed on stage.
Poem - a form of literature that uses aesthetic and often rhythmic qualities of language—such as phonaesthetics, sound symbolism, and metre—to evoke meaning
Quest narrative – a story in which the characters must achieve a goal.  This includes some illness narratives.
Realistic fiction – stories which portray fictional characters, settings, and events that could exist in real life.
Screenplay – a story that is told through dialogue and character action that is meant to be performed for a motion picture and exhibited on a screen.
Short story – a brief story that usually focuses on one character and one event.
Tall tale – a humorous story that tells about impossible happenings, exaggerating the hero's accomplishments.

See also
Bibliography
Literary device
Narrative mode

Notes

References

Literature lists